Radwan Talib Husayn Ismail al-Hamduni (died 2014), known as Abu Jurnas, was a senior Islamic State leader.

History

He was imprisoned in Camp Bucca at some point. He served as governor of the Islamic State's 'border province' and was IS emir of Mosul.

Death
He was killed November 2014 in Mosul.

References

2014 deaths
Iraqi Muslims
Islamic State of Iraq and the Levant members from Iraq